Drion's pill is a hypothetical suicide pill. It was proposed by Huib Drion, a former Dutch Supreme Court judge and professor of civil law. He argued that people aged 75 or over, living alone, should have the choice of ending their lives in a humane manner. The pill was supposed to be a two-staged pill whereby firstly one pill was taken which would enable another pill to be taken a number of days after the first pill which would then be lethal, but would otherwise be non-lethal. The idea behind this is that a person could act on an impulse and a waiting period seemed sensible.

So far this has been only discussed as a theoretical proposition. No such pill exists in the Netherlands or anywhere else.

See also 
 Euthanasia
 Huib Drion
 Suicide

References 
 British Medical Journal: Huibert Drion

External links 
  H. Drion, “Het zelfgewilde einde van oude mensen,” DBNL (Digitale Bibliotheek voor de Nederlandse letteren).
  H. Drion, “Het zelfgewilde einde van oudere mensen,” NRC Handelsblad (19 October 1991).

Euthanasia